Tritozyga is a genus of midges in the family Cecidomyiidae. The two described species are found in the Holarctic region. The genus was established in 1862 by German entomologist Hermann Loew.

Species
Tritozyga sackeni Felt, 1911
Tritozyga tyrestaensis Jaschhof, 2002

References

Cecidomyiidae genera

Insects described in 1862
Taxa named by Hermann Loew